The Eagle is an album by American country music artist Waylon Jennings, released on Epic Records in 1990. It was the first of his two solo albums on the label, which he joined after a two-year stay at MCA. This was also the last new Waylon Jennings album to be made available on LP; commercially in Europe, and only through the Columbia House record club in the US.

The selections themselves are a mixture of fast-paced songs and slower ballads. "Wrong", a humorous track about a relationship that turned awry, was Jennings' final top ten country hit, reaching #5 on the charts. The album also yielded the minor hits "What Bothers Me Most". Additionally, a music video for "Wrong", directed by Robert Deaton and George J. Flanigen IV, was filmed and released. The Eagle was the singer's final top ten record, reaching #9 on the country charts; it also briefly appeared on the pop charts, with its highest position being #172.

Jennings was less than charitable about his time at Epic, writing in his memoir that producer Bob Montgomery was "really hot to team me up with Willie," which would result in the Clean Shirt duet LP:  "Bob eventually got his way by doing the Waylon and Willie Clean Shirt album, which Epic thought had too many Mexican horns.  They didn't do much with my first album for them, The Eagle, either..."

Two of this album's songs were later recorded by other artists, both in 1996: "Her Man" on Gary Allan's debut album Used Heart for Sale, and "Where Corn Don't Grow" on Travis Tritt's album The Restless Kind. Both of these versions were released as singles that year.

Release formats
Like most new album releases at the time, "The Eagle" was issued in the US on CD and cassette. However, it was briefly available on LP (Columbia 1P-8030) only to members of the Columbia House record club. In Europe, the album was commercially released (Epic 467260-1) on all three formats, though the LP version was deleted shortly after release in favor of the CD and cassette issues.

Track listing

"Workin' Cheap" (Troy Seals, Max D. Barnes) – 2:55
"What Bothers Me Most" (Seals, Barnes) – 3:25
"The Eagle" (Hank Cochran, Red Lane, Mack Vickery) – 2:55
"Her Man" (Kent Robbins) – 2:42
"Wrong" (Steve Seskin, Andre Pessis) – 2:58
"Where Corn Don't Grow" (Roger Murrah, Mark Alan Springer) – 3:17
"Reno and Me" (John Hadley, Kevin Welch) – 3:11
"Too Close to Call" (Chester Lester) – 2:44
"Waking Up with You" (Murrah, Jennings, Charlie Craig) – 2:34
"Old Church Hymns and Nursery Rhymes" (Beth Nielsen Chapman) – 3:48

Personnel
 Jerry Bridges - bass guitar, acoustic guitar
 Jimmy Capps - acoustic guitar, mandolin
 Paul Franklin - dobro, pedal steel guitar
 Jeff Hale - drums
 Kevin Hogan - bass guitar
 Waylon Jennings - acoustic guitar, electric guitar, lead vocals, background vocals
 Brent Mason - electric guitar
 Barry Walsh - keyboards

Charts

Weekly charts

Year-end charts

References

External links
 [ Allmusic]

Waylon Jennings albums
1990 albums
Epic Records albums
Albums produced by Bob Montgomery (songwriter)